438th may refer to:

438th Air Expeditionary Advisory Group (438 AEAG), assigned to the 438th Air Expeditionary Wing of USAFCENT, stationed at Kabul Airport, Afghanistan
438th Air Expeditionary Group, provisional unit assigned to United States Air Forces Central to activate or inactivate as needed
438th Air Expeditionary Wing, an active United States Air Force unit operating in Afghanistan and assigned to United States Air Forces Central
438th Bombardment Squadron or 180th Airlift Squadron, unit of the Missouri Air National Guard 139th Airlift Wing located at Rosecrans Air National Guard Base, Missouri
438th Fighter-Interceptor Squadron, inactive United States Air Force unit

See also
438 (number)
438, the year 438 (CDXXXVIII) of the Julian calendar
438 BC